Presos (Inmate) is a 2015 Costa Rican drama film directed by Esteban Ramirez. The film was selected as entry for the Best Foreign Language Film at the 88th Academy Awards, but it was not nominated.

Plot
Presos is a drama film about a young woman whose safe existences unravels when she secretly befriends a prison inmate.

Cast
 Alejandro Aguilar as J.J.
 Natalia Arias as Victoria
 Rocío Carranza as Iris
 Leynar Gomez as Jason
 Daniel Marin as Emanuel
 Edgar Roman as Sebas
 Freddy Viquez as «Tanque»

Production
The film was shot in Guadalupe, San José and Costa Rica and produced by Amaya Izquierdo. It was director Ramírez's third film and inspired by the 1973 documentary Los Presos, done by Ramirez's father.

See also
 List of submissions to the 88th Academy Awards for Best Foreign Language Film
 List of Costa Rican submissions for the Academy Award for Best Foreign Language Film

References

External links
 

2015 films
2015 drama films
Costa Rican drama films
2010s Spanish-language films